Congleton High School (CHS) is an 11–18 mixed secondary school and sixth form with academy status in Congleton, Cheshire, England. It has a specialism in engineering.

History
The school was formed after the reduction of the area's three schools to two larger schools (the previous schools being Dane Valley High School, Heathfield High School and Westlands High School).

In 2022 Congleton High School applied for planning permission to expand, the planned expansion will add new classroom faculties and provide and a new dinning area for staff and students among other additions.

See also

Eaton Bank Academy

References

External links 
 

Academies in the Borough of Cheshire East
Secondary schools in the Borough of Cheshire East
Specialist engineering colleges in England